Thomas Chesson (c. 1867 – 6 May 1943) was an Australian trade unionist and politician who was a Labor Party member of the Legislative Assembly of Western Australia from 1913 to 1930, representing the seat of Cue.

Chesson was born in Adelong, New South Wales, to Bridget (née McKay) and John Benjamin Chesson. Arriving in Western Australia in the 1890s, he settled in the inland mining town of Cue, where he worked on the mines. He became prominent in local labour circles, serving as a branch official for various general unions. Chesson entered parliament in November 1913, following the resignation of Edward Heitmann. He was the only candidate at the by-election, and was re-elected unopposed another four times at state elections, only once facing another candidate (at the 1921 election). The seat of Cue was abolished at the 1930 election, and Chesson left parliament. He eventually retired to Perth, dying there in May 1943. He had married Kate Martin in 1901, with whom he had six children.

References

1867 births
1943 deaths
Australian Labor Party members of the Parliament of Western Australia
Australian trade unionists
Members of the Western Australian Legislative Assembly
People from Adelong, New South Wales